Zenon Kossak (April 1, 1907 – 1939) was an activist in the Ukrainian militant nationalist movement for independence from interwar Poland.

Kossak was born in Drohobych in Galicia (then part of the Austro-Hungarian Empire, now in Ukraine). He studied law at Lviv University and was one of the organizers of the nationalist movement in Galicia. 

He was a member of the Ukrainian Military Organization in the late 1920s where he directed the 'combat', then the organizational, activities of the Organization of Ukrainian Nationalists in 1939 as a member of its Home Executive.  He became deputy commander of the Carpathian Sich National Defense Organization in Carpatho-Ukraine.  He was killed in action by Hungarian troops in Solotvyna, near Bukshtyn, in Transcarpathia.

He wrote the 44 rules of a Ukrainian Nationalist.

Sources 

 from the Encyclopedia of Ukraine

References 

1907 births
1939 deaths
People from Drohobych
Military personnel killed in action
Organization of Ukrainian Nationalists politicians